Hoengseong Korean Beef Festival is a festival in Hoengseong, South Korea. The festival's name was originally Hoengseong Taepoong Cultural Festival. In 2004, it changed its name to the current one. The festival promotes the consumption of Korean beef made in Hoengseong, providing opportunities to try Korean beef and experience agricultural programs which cannot be seen in cities.

References

External links
Official site

Food and drink festivals in South Korea
Hoengseong County
Meat festivals
Agriculture in South Korea